Christine Arrighi (born 19 September 1959) is a French politician from EELV (NUPES). She became the Member of Parliament for Haute-Garonne's 9th constituency in the 2022 French legislative election.

References

See also 

 List of deputies of the 16th National Assembly of France

1959 births
Living people
Members of Parliament for Haute-Garonne
Women members of the National Assembly (France)
Europe Ecology – The Greens politicians
Deputies of the 16th National Assembly of the French Fifth Republic
21st-century French politicians
21st-century French women politicians